Winky may refer to:

People 
 Winky Hicks, bluegrass musician and instrument maker from Grove Hill, Alabama
 Winky Wiryawan (born 1978), actor from Indonesia
 Winky Wright (born 1971), American boxer

Fictional characters 
 Winky (Harry Potter), a character in the Harry Potter series
 Winky, Blinky, and Noddy, one of a trio of fictional comic book characters
 Winky (Donkey Kong), a character in Donkey Kong Country
 Wee Willie Winkie, a Scottish nursery rhyme

Other uses 
 Slang for penis, the primary sexual organ of male animals
 Winkysoft, a Japanese video game developing company

See also 
 Wink
 Winkie (disambiguation)
 Winky D (born 1983)
 Winky Dink and You